The Sacco chair, also called a bean bag chair, beanbag chair, or simply a beanbag (“Sacco” is Italian for “bag, sack”), is a large fabric bag, filled with polystyrene beans, designed by Piero Gatti, Cesare Paolini and Franco Teodoro. The product is an example of an anatomic chair, as the shape of the object is set by the user. Sacco was awarded the XXVI Premio Compasso d'Oro and is exhibited in the permanent collection of the most important contemporary art museums throughout the world.

History 
Sacco was introduced in 1968 by three Italian designers: Piero Gatti, Cesare Paolini and Franco Teodoro. The object was created in the Italian Modernism movement. Being a post war era phenomenon, Italian modernism’s design was highly inspired by new available technology. Post war technology allowed an increase in the processes of production, by introducing new materials such as polystyrene. The idea of mass-produced goods made within an inexpensive price range appealed to consumers. It therefore created the need for a revolution in the creative and manufacturing process. ‘The designer was an integral member of a process that included marketing as well as engineering’. The inspiration left by Corradino D’Ascano’s Vespa design for the Piaggio Corporation in 1946, added value to the essence of the designer. With successful designs, brands could sell more products, and therefore the identity of the designer played an important advertising role. Another important figure of the Italian modernism period was Gio Ponti. Inspired by modernism's art movements, Ponti created new forms of objects. His asymmetrically balanced designs freed the Italian objects form their classic representations. The designer promoted Italian designs on famous exhibitions called 'Milan Triennale': "These exhibitions, organized as early as the 1920s … were responsible for increasing the visibility of Italian design in an international setting". After becoming an editor of the Domus (magazine) in 1947, Ponti contributed to not only Italian design of that time, but also : “the human and creative element in modern industrial design as well as its practical, economic and social benefits."

Piero Gatti, Cesare Paolini and Franco Teodoro, inspired by their designer predecessors, came up in 1968 with the design of Sacco, the ‘shapeless chair’. Although it was not the first design of an amorphous chair in Italian history, Sacco was the first successful product created in partnership with Zanotta. The predecessor of the product had a major design flaw of not being able to sustain its form and therefore never reached production. Sacco picked up that flaw and with the use of leather for exterior and right placed stitching. It is worth mentioning that the use of leather was not coincidental as at that time the textile was an Italian national pride product. The target user of the chair was the lax, hippie community and their non-conformist household. "In an era characterized by the hippie culture, apartment sharing and student demonstrations, the thirty-something designers created a nonpoltrona (non-chair) and thus launched an attack on good bourgeois taste."

Sacco is part of the permanent collection of the most important museums of contemporary art throughout the world, such as the Museum of Modern Art in New York, the Centre Pompidou in Paris and the Victoria and Albert Museum in London. Sacco was part of the 1972 exhibition at the Museum of Modern Art in New York Italy: The New Domestic Landscape - Achievements and Problems of Italian Design and was awarded, in 1973, the BIO 5 at the Biennale of Design in Ljubljana. In 2020 Sacco received the prestigious Compasso d'Oro Award.

Cesare Paolini, architect, graduated from the Polytechnic University of Turin. Franco Teodoro and Piero Gatti, designers, studied at the Istituto Tecnico Industriale Statale per le Arti Grafiche e Fotografiche of Turin.

Piero Gatti, Cesare Paolini and Franco Teodoro established their architecture firm in Turin in 1965.

Exhibitions 

Museum of Modern Art, New York: Recent Acquisitions: Design Collection, 1 December 1970, 31 January 1971

Museum of Modern Art, New York: Italy: The New Domestic Landscape, 26 May - 11 September 1972

Solomon R. Guggenheim Museum, The Italian Metamorphosis,1943-1968, 7 October 1994—22 January 1995 [Triennale di Milano February—May 1995, Kunstmuseum Wolfsburg May—September 1995]

Museum of Modern Art, New York: Architecture and Design: Inaugural Installation, 20 November 2004 - 7 November 2005

Kanal — Centre Pompidou,  Brussels: Phantom offices, 23 January - 30 June 2019

Cité de l’Architecture et du Patrimoine, Paris: Architects’ Furniture: 1960–2020, September 2019

Musée d'Art Moderne et Contemporain de Saint-Étienne, Saint-Priest-en-Jarez: Déjà-vu. Le design dans notre quotidien, 15 December 2020 - 22 August 2021

Collections 
Museum of Modern Art, New York

Israel Museum, Jerusalem

Uměleckoprůmyslové Muzeum, Prague

Kunstgewerbemuseum, Berlin

Victoria and Albert Museum,  London

Kunstmuseum, Düsseldorf

Museum für angewandte Kunst, Vienna

Taideteollisuusmuseo Konstindustrimuseet, Helsinki

Musée des Arts Décoratifs, Paris

The Saint Louis Art Museum, Saint Louis

Museo dell'arredo contemporaneo, Russi (Ra)

Museum für Kunst und Gewerbe, Hamburg

Denver Art Museum, Denver

Dallas Museum of Art, Dallas

Fondazione Triennale Design Museum, Milan

Tel Aviv Museum of Art, Tel Aviv

Vitra Design Museum, Weil am Rhein

Musée National d'Art Moderne (Centre Pompidou), Paris

Thessaloniki Design Museum, Thessaloniki

Brücke-Museum, Berlin

Fonds Régional d'Art Contemporain, Dunkerque

Centro Arte e Design, Calenzano

Museum of Applied Arts and Sciences, Powerhouse Museum, Sydney

Museum voor Sierkunst en Vormgeving, Gent

Philadelphia Museum of Art, Philadelphia

Shiodome Italia Creative Center, Tokyo

Musée d'Art Moderne et Contemporain de Saint-Étienne, Auvergne-Rhône-Alpes

Awards 
Bio 5 Ljubljana, Biennale of Design Ljubljana, 1973

Selected for the Compasso d'Oro Award, 1970

M.I.A.- Mostra Internazionale dell'Arredamento, Monza, 1968

XXVI Compasso d'Oro Award, 2020

Sacco in the media 

Sacco often appears in the strips Peanuts by Charles M. Schulz.

Other bean bag chair products inspired by Sacco
Other designers have followed the "shapeless" chair design, creating a range of inspired products that take after Sacco. Amongst many, the most successful contemporary model would be Jukka Setala’s Fatboy. The product launched in 2002 brought the Finnish designer global recognition. The new form of the bean bag chair has less stitching and a more geometrical take in the means of shape. It also has an EPS filling which is more durable than PVC.

Bibliography 
 Paola Antonelli (Museum of Modern Art | MOMA), Sacco Chair | Object Lesson
 Mel Byars, The Design Encyclopedia, New York, John Wiley & Sons, Inc., 1994
 Emilio Ambasz [a cura di], Italy: The New Domestic Landscape - Achievements and Problems of Italian Design, New York, Museum Of Modern Art, 1972
 Grace Lees-Maffei, Kjetil Fallan [editors], Made in Italy Rethinking a Century of Italian Design, London, Bloomsbury Academic, 2014
 Paola Antonelli, Matilda McQuaid, Objects of Design from the Museum of Modern Art, Museum of Modern Art (New York, N.Y.), 2003
 Bernhard E. Bürdek, Design Storia, Teoria e Pratica del Design del Prodotto, Roma, Gangemi Editore, 2008
 Modern Chairs 1918-1970, London: Lund Humphries. 1971
 Victor Papanek, Design for the Real World, New York: 1974
 Moderne Klassiker, Mobel, die Geschichte machen, Hamburg, 1982
 Kathryn B. Hiesinger and George H. Marcus III (eds.), Design Since 1945, Philadelphia, Philadelphia Museum of Art, 1983
 Fifty Chairs that Changed the World: Design Museum Fifty, London's Design Museum, London,  
 Charlotte Fiell, Peter Fiell, Plastic dreams: synthetic visions in design, Carlton Books Ltd, 2010, 
 Anne Bony, Design: History, Main Trends, Major Figures, Larousse/Chambers, 2005
 Bernd Polster, Claudia Newman, Markus Schuler, The A-Z of Modern Design, Merrell Publishers Ltd, 2009, 
 Domitilla Dardi, Il design in cento oggetti, Federico Motta Editore, Milano, 2008, 
 Anty Pansera, Il Design del mobile italiano dal 1946 a oggi, Laterza, 1990
 Charles Boyce, Joseph T. Butler, Dictionary of Furniture, Simon and Schuster, New York, 2014, 
 Michael Tambini, The Look of the Century, DK Pub., 1999,  
 AA.VV., 100 objects of italian design La Triennale di Milano: Permanent Collection of Italian Design, The Milan Triennale, Gangemi Editore
 Germano Celant [ed.], preface by Umberto Eco,The Italian Metamorphosis, 1943–1968, Guggenheim Museum Publications, New York, 1994, 
 Fiorella Bulegato, Elena Dellapiana, Il design degli architetti italiani 1920-2000, Mondadori Electa, 2014, 
 Cindi Strauss, Germano Celant, J. Taylor Kubala, Radical - Italian Design 1965-1985 - The Dennis Freedman Collection, Yale University Press, 2020

References

External links 

Museum of Modern Art, New York
 Victoria & Albert Museum, London
 Centre Pompidou, Paris 
Vitra Design Museum
 Museum of Applied Arts & Sciences, Sidney 
 Paola Antonelli (Museum of Modern Art, New York), Sacco Chair | Object Lesson
Italy: The New Domestic Landscape, Museum Of Modern Art, New York 
The Italian Metamorphosis,1943-1968, Solomon R. Guggenheim Museum, New York
Cesare Paolini [architect], Museum Of Modern Art, New York | Centre Pompidou
Franco Teodoro, Museum Of Modern Art, New York
Piero Gatti, Museum Of Modern Art, New York

Furniture
Seats
Modernism
Design
Products introduced in 1968
History of furniture
Italian design
Italian furniture designers
Italian inventions
Compasso d'Oro Award recipients